The 2014 ECAC Hockey Men's Ice Hockey Tournament was the 53rd tournament in league history. It was played between March 7 and March 22, 2014. First Round and Quarterfinal games were played at home team campus sites, while the final four games were played at the Herb Brooks Arena in Lake Placid, New York. By winning the tournament, Union received the ECAC's automatic bid to the 2014 NCAA Division I Men's Ice Hockey Tournament.

Format
The tournament featured four rounds of play. The teams that finish above fifth place in the standings receive a bye to the quarterfinal round. In the first round, the fifth and twelfth seeds, the sixth and eleventh seeds, the seventh and tenth seeds and the eighth and ninth seeds played a best-of-three series with the winners advancing to the quarterfinals. In the quarterfinals the one seed plays the lowest remaining seed, the second seed plays the second-lowest remaining seed, the third seed plays the third-lowest remaining seed and the fourth seed plays the fourth-lowest remaining seed another best-of-three series with the winners of these the series advancing to the Semifinals. In the semifinals the top remaining seed plays the lowest remaining seed while the two remaining teams play against each other. The winners of the semifinals play in the championship game while the losers play in a third-place game. All series after the quarterfinals are single-elimination games. The tournament champion receives an automatic bid to the 2014 NCAA Division I Men's Ice Hockey Tournament.

The third place game was eliminated from the tournament starting in 2014.

Conference standings
Note: GP = Games played; W = Wins; L = Losses; T = Ties; PTS = Points; GF = Goals For; GA = Goals Against

Bracket
Teams are reseeded after the First Round and Quarterfinals

Note: * denotes overtime period(s)

First round

(5) Clarkson vs. (12) Princeton

(6) Yale vs. (11) Harvard

(7) Rensselaer vs. (10) Dartmouth

(8) St. Lawrence vs. (9) Brown

Quarterfinals

(1) Union vs. (10) Dartmouth

(2) Colgate vs. (8) St. Lawrence

(3) Quinnipiac vs. (6) Yale

(4) Cornell vs. (5) Clarkson

Semifinals

(1) Union vs. (4) Cornell

(2) Colgate vs. (3) Quinnipiac

Championship

(1) Union vs. (2) Colgate

Tournament awards

All-Tournament Team
F Daniel Carr* (Union)
F Tyson Spink (Colgate)
F Mike Vecchione (Union)
D Mathew Bodie (Union)
D Shayne Gostisbehere (Union)
G Colin Stevens (Union)
* Most Outstanding Player(s)

References

External links
ECAC Hockey

ECAC Hockey Men's Ice Hockey Tournament
ECAC tournament